Viktor Hryhorovych Kaplun (born 5 May 1958 in Zaporizhia) is a retired Ukrainian and Soviet football player of Jewish ethnicity.

Honours
Soviet Union
 1977 FIFA World Youth Championship winner
 1980 UEFA European Under-21 Football Championship winner
Dynamo Kyiv
 Soviet Top League winner: 1980, 1981.
Metalist Kharkiv
 Soviet Cup finalist: 1983

International career
Kaplun played his only game for USSR on December 4, 1980 in a friendly against Argentina.

References
  Profile

1958 births
Living people
Footballers from Zaporizhzhia
Jewish Ukrainian sportspeople
Soviet footballers
Ukrainian footballers
Soviet Union international footballers
FC Metalist Kharkiv players
FC Dynamo Kyiv players
Soviet Top League players
Association football defenders